Initially created by Mr. Mika Wirtanen and registered at traderegister in Finland 1995, Stargames Oy was established in Oulu as a brand name for physical exercises and sporting events as well as equipment sales in 1993 when the kickboxing club was established. Mika Wirtanen supervised the first basic and advanced courses in the capital of Northern Finland and was later assisted by assistant instructors Mr. Erkki Lassila, Mr. Kimmo Koivisto and Mr. Veli-Pekka Porola. The primary focus of the club’s activities was on physical exercise of the body. In addition, training was provided for trainees interested in the competition, e.g. the competition activities and related judging activities, as well as its requirements, which the students were responsible for on their own because the club’s focus was on non-competitive activities. There were also two qualified persons in charge of the judiciary. The first blue and green training season in Northern Finland was completed by Polish world champion Bogdan Sawicki and Mika Wirtanen with his assistance instructors. 

The industry expanded in 1995 as a brand of computer and sports video games, eSports and online gaming. For the online business, the company has reserved the first domain address for development in the 2000s and in 2022 the company’s expanded IPR portfolio including elements such as copyright, trademark and related domains, etc. has been presented at a special social media briefing as well as the company’s statutory annual meeting.

In addition, the Stargames has sponsored international doctoral training to better implement the scientific content and presentation of the DBA, MBA and BBA level studies into the strategy and business model of it´s own by supporting doctoral students’ research on the topic of Examining Sustainability Leadership in the Sports Industry: A Case Study of Stargames. More information is available on the website and company´s forum for members. A previous doctoral level research has been conducted under the title Stargames World IP Review and the preceding MBA research such as Stargames connected trademarks - Development of IPR portfolio also refers to the following article s and enterprise of Shufflemaster, and Novomatic Ag owned subsidiary like Greentube Internet Entertainment Solutions GmbH.

StarGames, LLC is a sports marketing managed by Jerry Solomon, management and entertainment company based outside of Boston, Massachusetts. StarGames represents current and former professional athletes (Including Nancy Kerrigan and Ivan Lendl), produces original content for mass media distribution, operates its own broadband television channels and produces live and made for television events.

StarGames brought tennis back to Madison Square Garden with the 2008 NetJets Showdown and the BNP Paribas Showdown for the Billie Jean King Cup, most recently produced the Caesars Tennis Classic in Atlantic City, New Jersey and television series, "The World of Tennis Presented by BNP Paribas" on MSG Plus.

In addition, partnering with tennis player Ivan Lendl, StarGames has launched the Champions Academy in Florida for elite junior athletes.

StarGames Online Casino 
StarGames is a web-based Online Casino offering several slots, table games and poker. It was second only to SuperGaminator, another web-based Online Casino.

References

Sports management companies